St. Crispin's Senior Secondary School (or Saint Crispin's Senior Secondary School, often abbreviated as St. Crispin's Sr. Sec. School) is an English-medium senior secondary school in Gurgaon, Haryana. Having been founded in 1895, the school is one of the oldest in Gurgaon.

History 
St. Crispin's Sr. Sec. School was founded in 1895. The school was previously a vocational one meant to give industrial training to its students. The school later became an educational institution in 1924. The level of the school was raised to secondary level in 1975 which was followed by further elevation to senior secondary level in 1987. The school got affiliated to CBSE in 2002.

Overview 
The school is affiliated to CBSE and offers classes from Nursery to 12th in all streams, i.e., science, commerce and humanities. It is currently governed by its principal, Mrs. Poornima Lall and is an independent school, i.e., it is run without any financial aid from the government.

Houses 
St. Crispin's Senior Secondary School consists of four houses, each named after river- Brahmaputra, Mandakini, Jhelum, Kaveri. Each house is headed by a house in-charge and supported by a team of house captains and vice-captains. The house system is required for the inter-house activities held occasionally in the school.
{| class="wikitable"
|-
! House !! Colour !! Relevant Indian rivers
|-
| Jhelum ||  Red || Jhelum
|-
| Mandakini ||  Yellow || Mandakini
|-
| Bharamaputra ||  Green || Bharamaputra
|-
| Kaveri ||  Blue || Kaveri
|}

See also 
 List of Schools in Gurgaon

References

External links 
 

High schools and secondary schools in Haryana
Primary schools in India
Schools in Gurgaon
Educational institutions established in 1895
1895 establishments in India
Christian schools in Haryana